Fudbalski Klub Krajina Cazin, commonly referred to as FK Krajina Cazin or simply Krajina Cazin, is a Bosnian football club based in Cazin. They currently play in the Second League of the Federation of Bosnia and Herzegovina (West), one of six divisions at the third tier, and in the Bosnian Cup. They last competed in the Bosnian Premier League in the 2000–01 season.

History
FK Krajina Cazin was founded in 1932, and competed in the lower regional and amateur leagues in Yugoslavia until the independence of Bosnia and Hercegovina. From 1992 to 1997, the club joined the First League of Bosnia and Herzegovina - today known as Premier League of Bosnia and Herzegovina, which was the top league for clubs with a connection of Bosnian Federation. Again, in the 2000–2001 season, the club entered the Bosnian Premier League season, which also included clubs of Croat ethnicity. Due to large migration of population to Western Europe and USA, especially young talented athletes club suffered the loss of dozens of players.- Accordingly, Soccer Club Krajina performed poorly in this season, finishing second bottom with just three wins in 42 fixtures with 149 goals conceded. They also suffered the highest defeat, which was an 6–0 loss to Brotnjo Citluk.

In the 2000s (decade), the club has mainly competed in the First League of FBiH. This is one of two second tier divisions, for clubs of Croat and Bosniak ethnicity; Serbian clubs instead compete in the First League of the Republika Srpska. In both the 2006–07 and 2008–09 seasons, the club finished third bottom and were relegated to the Second League of FBiH – North, but in both case returned to the First League of FBiH the following season.

In recent seasons they have come close to gaining promotion to the Premier League for a second time. In the 2010–11 season they finished the First League of FBiH campaign in third place, nine points behind champions NK GOŠK Gabela.

Club seasons
Sources:

Players

Notable players
For a list of players with Wikipedia article, please see :Category:FK Krajina Cazin players.

Historical list of coaches

  Arif Ružnić (2007-2008)
  Izet Račić (2009-2011)
  Muhamed Berberović (2011-2012)
  Nurudin Nožić (2012-February 2013)
  Arif Ružnić (February 2013 – 2014)
  Muhamed Berberović (2014-2017)
  Muhamed Berberović (2018-2019)

References

External links
FK Krajina at Football Association of Bosnia-Hercegovina

Association football clubs established in 1932
Football clubs in Bosnia and Herzegovina
Sport in the Federation of Bosnia and Herzegovina
Football clubs in Yugoslavia
1932 establishments in Bosnia and Herzegovina